Jean-Claude is a fictional character in the Anita Blake: Vampire Hunter series of novels by Laurell K. Hamilton. Within the novels, Jean-Claude's role is as one of the primary love interests of the series heroine, Anita Blake.

Jean-Claude is a French-born vampire who is over 400–600 years old.  He was a favorite of Belle Morte for his eyes, and, like many vampires of Belle Morte's line, Jean-Claude was selected for his almost perfect mortal beauty. He arrived in St. Louis and, indeed, the United States itself to escape Belle Morte's court with the help of Augustine. Jean-Claude became the Master Vampire of St. Louis after Anita Blake killed Nikolaos. Together with Richard Zeeman, Jean-Claude is a member of Anita's first triumvirate.

Jean-Claude's daytime lair is the sub-basement of the Circus of the Damned.  As owner of the "JC Corporation," he also owns and runs Guilty Pleasures, The Laughing Corpse, and Danse Macabre, as well as other clubs.

Powers and abilities
Jean Claude, although a 'master vampire' in times passed would have been known as or called an incubus, because his only craving is not blood. But, thanks to the particular 'gifts' or 'powers' of the bloodline he descends from Jean Claude must also feed a craving for "lust."  This craving is particularly ravenous, can seem cruel and in its first stages can be difficult to rein-in to control it so that it does not control you, (as he was forced to educate Anita on, at which point she began to appreciate the previously unknown suffering that Jean Claude had subjected himself to, because of his deep love for her. This was the main reason he opened 'Guilty Pleasures,' so he could feed off the patrons lust from a distance without touching anyone.)   We know that Jean Claude is a vampire and not an actual demon, as the incubi and succubi are.

Jean Claude also gains power through sex and lust. After forging the triumvirate with Anita and Richard he becomes the sourde de sang of his own Bloodline. Like all vampires his powers grow stronger with age.  His general master class abilities include:
Being able to disguise the perception of his true age (seeming older or younger as he chooses) to the senses of other vampires.
The *Ardeur, that gives him power ( or to "feed") from lust and sex. His first business, the strip club Guilty Pleasures, allows him to use the ardeur to his advantage. In Cerulean Sins Jean-Claude becomes sourde de sang of his own line when Belle-Morte is no longer able to use her own ardeur to feed from him.
Hypnosis, including using his voice, gaze, and aura to excite or calm humans, lycanthropes, and lesser vampires.
Calling wolves and werewolves.
Flight.
Controlling the magics of Anita and Richard and being able to shut them down.
Forming a triumvirate with his human servant, Anita, and his animal to call, Richard.

Description
Perhaps because the patrons of Guilty Pleasures expect it, Jean-Claude tends to dress the way vampires are stereotypically expected to, wearing skin-tight leather pants, thigh high boots, and antique shirts with large amounts of lace and long cuffs, left open just enough to give glimpses of his bare chest. He is 5'11", with black shoulder-length softly curling hair, and midnight-blue eyes. By the timeline of 'Narcissus in Chains,' he has grown out his hair to near waist-length. He has long-fingered slender hands, and his voice is rich, melodious, textured and seductive when he wants it to be. When he calls on his full power, his humanity folds away; his skin becomes white like glowing alabaster, his eye sockets become blue fire, and his hair floats around his death-pale, skeletal face. He has a cross-shaped scar on his left breast from where he was burned by a cross. He also has whip scars on his back that like his chest scar he cannot hide with his powers.

Character
Jean-Claude is extraordinarily seductive, both in regard to his mental abilities and conventional seduction. He is superb at playing "vampire politics" and can be extremely manipulative and ruthless when necessary. Jean-Claude typically thinks several steps ahead of his triumvirate partners Anita and Richard. He is also considered more "human" than most vampires, though other masters see this as a weakness. 

Throughout the early novels, Jean-Claude pursues Anita both as a lover and a human servant, eventually winning her as both. He frequently withholds the truth of matters from Anita, partly from a well-learned and practiced sense of manipulativeness and desire to use Anita's power to protect himself, his own interests, and those under his protection, but also from an, apparently, surprisingly strong sense of real love and concern for Anita's physical and emotional well-being.

Jean-Claude's personality combines hedonism with immense self-control. During his pursuit of Anita he is able, for years, to control his own ardeur in her presence, and be unfailingly pleasant and courteous, even as she holds him at arm's length.

Jean-Claude is bisexual; he has had many male and female lovers over the centuries, and enjoyed a 20-year-long ménage à trois with fellow vampire Asher and Asher's human servant, Julianna.

Emotionally, Jean-Claude holds himself apart from even those he considers valued friends, having learned from Asher's mutilation and Julianna's murder that, if his affection becomes common knowledge, his friends will become targets for his enemies. Only among those with a power level high enough to defend themselves, such as Anita and Richard, against strong attackers will he let his affection become obvious.

Biographical summary
Jean-Claude is approximately four hundred to six hundred years old.  He was born to a French peasant family in the fourteenth century, and was astoundingly beautiful even as a child. He was selected to be the whipping boy for a noble child of his age. He was raised in a noble household and educated as a noble, but was severely beaten in place of the young noble whenever the other child misbehaved. Jean-Claude still has scars on his back from that experience.

When Jean-Claude was a little over thirty years old, he was killed and raised as a vampire by Lissette, a vampire in Belle Morte's bloodline. Jean-Claude spent the next five years in the court of Julian, Lissette's master, having sex with whomever Julian chose, unable to say no while in the grip of the ardeur.

Later, Jean-Claude joined Belle Morte's court as one of her favorites, remaining there for several years.

At some time during the seventeenth century, Jean-Claude left Belle Morte's court and traveled with Asher and Asher's human servant, Julianna.  The three travelled together as a ménage à trois for twenty years. Jean-Claude states that at this time, he and Asher were "masters of comparable power," which suggests that he matured remarkably early to have become a master within his own mother's lifetime. When Jean-Claude temporarily left the other two to attend his mother's funeral, he returned too late to prevent Julianna's death and Asher's torture at the hands of human captors working for the church. Asher was disfigured using holy water, and Julianna was burnt at the stake for being a witch. Jean-Claude has stated that he "humbled" himself to rescue Asher, agreeing to one hundred years in Belle Morte's service in return for her help saving Asher.

After rejoining the Council's service, Jean-Claude was imprisoned alone in a cross-wrapped coffin for two years, unable to feed his ardeur.  Belle Morte also used Jean-Claude as a sort of prostitute for more powerful vampires, presumably both before and after Jean-Claude's travels with Asher. Jean-Claude refers to himself during this period as a "catamite," but it appears that he was provided to both male and female vampires. At some point, Belle Morte gave Jean-Claude to Serephina.  After approximately 100 years of service, Jean-Claude left Belle Morte's court for an unprecedented second time.

Story within the novels
By the time of the first novel, Guilty Pleasures, Jean-Claude has become a master vampire in the service of Nikolaos, although he conceals the true extent of his powers, apparently biding his time for an opportunity to become his own master.  When a series of murders eliminates a number of the other master vampires in Nikolaos's service, Jean-Claude makes his move, manipulating Anita into killing Nikolaos and rendering him Master of the City of St. Louis.

Throughout the next several novels, Jean-Claude struggles to maintain authority over the city.  With the help of Anita and the werewolves of the city, he is ultimately able to fend off a number of challenges from the Vampire Council and other threats and consolidate control. But not always he succeeds in it.

Appearances
(See individual novel pages for a discussion of Jean-Claude's role in each novel in which he appears.) 

Guilty Pleasures, The Laughing Corpse, Circus of the Damned, The Lunatic Cafe, Bloody Bones, The Killing Dance, Burnt Offerings, Blue Moon, Obsidain Butterfly, Narcissus in Chains,  Cerulean Sins, Incubus Dreams, Danse Macabre, The Harlequin, Blood Noir, Skin Trade, Bullet. Hit List, Kiss the Dead, Affliction, Jason, Dead Ice

Anita Blake: Vampire Hunter characters
Fictional characters with superhuman strength
Fictional bisexual males
Fictional vampires
Vampires in written fiction
Fictional LGBT characters in literature